Xinhua Hospital is a general hospital in Shanghai, China, with the rank of "Grade 3, Class A". The hospital was established in 1958. It is a university hospital affiliated with School of Medicine, Shanghai Jiao Tong University. Xinhua Hospital is noted for its pediatrics, and is home to the Shanghai Institute for Pediatric Research. It is one of the few hospitals in China able to perform cardiac surgery on newborns, including transposition of great vessels.

In 1998, the hospital helped to establish Shanghai Children's Medical Center with support from Project HOPE (Health Opportunities for People Everywhere).

Transport 
Metro Line 8, Jiangpu Road Station
Bus: 6, 14, 103, 145, 220, 871, 70, 713, 843, 960

References 
Introduction of Xinhua Hospital 
Introduction of Xinhua Hospital from the website of School of Medicine, SJTU

External links
 Official Website of Xinhua Hospital

Hospitals established in 1958
Teaching hospitals in Shanghai
1958 establishments in China
Shanghai Jiao Tong University